Darkhhita is a rural locality (an ulus) in Zaigrayevsky District, Republic of Buryatia, Russia. The population was 256 as of 2010.

Geography 
Darkhhita is located 41 km southeast of Zaigrayevo (the district's administrative centre) by road. Tashelan is the nearest rural locality.

References 

Rural localities in Zaigrayevsky District